Lúcio de Castro (1 October 1910 – 20 May 2004) was a Brazilian athlete. He competed in the men's pole vault at the 1932 Summer Olympics.

References

1910 births
2004 deaths
Athletes (track and field) at the 1932 Summer Olympics
Brazilian male pole vaulters
Olympic athletes of Brazil
Place of birth missing
20th-century Brazilian people